Erigavo, also spelled as Erigabo, is the capital and largest city of the Sanaag region of Somaliland.

History

The Erigavo settlement is several centuries old. The surrounding area was supposedly built by the Madigan Dir. Modern Erigavo was founded by the Musa Ismail sub-clan of the Habr Yunis as a home well for passing nomads and caravans. The general area is noted for its numerous historical tombs, where various Somali clan patriarchs are buried.

1945 Sheikh Bashir Rebellion

The 1945 Sheikh Bashir Rebellion was a rebellion waged by tribesmen of the Habr Je'lo clan in the cities of Burao and Erigavo in the former British Somaliland protectorate against British authorities in July 1945 led by Sheikh Bashir, a Somali religious leader.

On 2 July, Sheikh Bashir collected 25 of his followers in the town of Wadamago and transported them on a lorry to the vicinity of Burao, where he distributed arms to half of his followers. On the evening of 3 July the group entered Burao and opened fire on the police guard of the central prison in the city, which was filled with prisoners arrested for previous demonstrations. The group also attacked the house of the district commissioner of Burao District, Major Chambers, resulting in the death of Major Chamber's police guard before escaping to Bur Dhab, a strategic mountain south-east of Burao, where Sheikh Bashir's small unit occupied a fort and took up a defensive position in anticipation of a British counterattack.

The British campaign against Sheikh Bashir's troops proved abortive after several defeats as his forces kept moving from place to place and avoiding any permanent location. No sooner had the expedition left the area, than the news traveled fast among the Somali nomads across the plain. The war had exposed the British administration to humiliation. The government came to a conclusion that another expedition against him would be useless; that they must build a railway, make roads and effectively occupy the whole of the protectorate, or else abandon the interior completely. The latter course was decided upon, and during the first months of 1945, the advance posts were withdrawn and the British administration confined to the coast town of Berbera.

Sheikh Bashir settled many disputes among the tribes in the vicinity, which kept them from raiding each other. He was generally thought to settle disputes through the use of Islamic Sharia and gathered around him a strong following.

Sheikh Bashir sent a message to religious figures in the town of Erigavo and called on them to revolt and join the rebellion he led. The religious leaders as well as the people of Erigavo heeded his call, and mobilized a substantial number of people in Erigavo armed with rifles and spears and staged a revolt. The British authorities responded rapidly and severely, sending reinforcements to the town and opening fire on the armed mobs in two "local actions" as well as arresting minor religious leaders in the town.

The British administration recruited Indian and South African troops, led by police general James David, to fight against Sheikh Bashir and had intelligence plans to capture him alive. The British authorities mobilized a police force, and eventually on 7 July found Sheikh Bashir and his unit in defensive positions behind their fortifications in the mountains of Bur Dhab. After clashes Sheikh Bashir and his second-in-command, Alin Yusuf Ali, nicknamed Qaybdiid, were killed. A third rebel was wounded and was captured along with two other rebels. The rest fled the fortifications and dispersed. On the British side the police general leading the British troops as well as a number of Indian and South African troops perished in the clashes, and a policeman was injured.

Despite the death of Sheikh Bashir and his followers resistance against British authorities continued in Somaliland, especially in Erigavo where his death stirred further resistance in the town and the town of Badhan and lead to attacks on British colonial troops throughout the district and the seizing of arms from the rural constabulary.

Geography

Environment

 to the north of the town are the remains of a juniper forest, running along the edge of the escarpment overlooking the Gulf of Aden. A road also leads up from Erigavo to Daallo mountain. At the mountain's peak, the sea can be observed in addition to the ancient town of Hiis situated nearby.

Erigavo is also home to many animal and plant species. Wildlife native to the area include dorcas gazelle, gerenuk, Salt's dik-dik, hamadryas baboon, desert warthog, spotted hyena, striped hyena, black-backed jackal, African golden wolf, honey badger and Somali ostrich.

Climate
Under the Köppen climate classification, Erigavo features a mild version of the semi-arid climate. The city generally sees equable temperatures year round, with some of the mildest weather in all of Somaliland. Despite its location in the tropics, due to the high altitude, temperatures rarely exceed . Nights are frequently cool during the summer season and cold during the winter. This is a trait shared with very few places in the world; notable locations with similar climate are Sana'a in Yemen or Arequipa in Peru. The city receives on average under  of rain annually. Absolute minimum temperatures sometimes touch or cross .

Demographics

According to Hoehne and Zenker: 

In 1997, Matt Bryden said the Habr Yunis and the Habr Je'lo clans of the Isaaq wholly dominated the city. The Darod clans are the Dhulbahante, Warsangali, Majeerteen (Gahayle) and Ogaden (Jibrahil). The Magaadle Dir are also represented in the city.

Education
Higher learning in Erigavo is provided by East Africa University (EAU), which has one of its six branches in the city. The Sanaag University also offers tertiary courses and degrees, and Gollis university has a branch and many colleges. Queen of Sheba University offers women in Sanaag free degree courses and a limited number of places worldwide in distance mode.

Administration
Town affairs are managed by the mayor of Erigavo. Taxes are levied and collected by the local town council as of 1999.

Services
The city is home to a Boy Scouts organization. Formed in 2005 by the local Sanaag administration, the Scouts partake in various activities, including a 2006 training program on governance, peace and leadership.

Notable residents
Abdullahi Qarshe - Father of Somali music.
Jama Ali Korshel – former Vice President of the Supreme Revolutionary Council

References

External links

Erigavo, Somalia

Populated places in Sanaag